Roitman is an Ashkenazi Jewish surname. Notable people with the surname include:

A. A. Roitman, mathematician who introduced Roitman's theorem
David Roitman (born 1884), Russian-American hazzan and composer
Janet Roitman, American anthropologist known for her research based on fieldwork in Central Africa
Judith Roitman (born 1945), mathematician, currently a professor at the University of Kansas
Sergio Roitman (born 1979), professional tennis player from Argentina
Volf Roitman (born 1930), painter, sculptor and architect, son of Russian/Romanian parents
 Jakob  Roitman, birth name of Iosif Chișinevschi (1905–1963), Romanian communist politician

Fictional characters
 Odete Roitman, a villain (played by the actress Beatriz Segall) in the Brazilian telenovela Vale Tudo

See also
Reutemann
Rotman (disambiguation)
Rothmann
Rothman
Rottmann
Rottman

Yiddish-language surnames

pt:Roitman